Phoxocampus tetrophthalmus, also known as the trunk-barred pipefish is a species of marine fish belonging to the family Syngnathidae. This species can be found in reefs and tide pools of the Indo-Pacific specifically Indonesia, the Philippines, and Guam. They have also been observed in the Andaman, Cocos-Keeling, and Ryukyu islands. Their diet likely consists of small crustaceans Reproduction occurs through ovoviviparity in which the males brood eggs before giving live birth.

References

External links 

 Phoxocampus tetrophthalmus at FishBase

Syngnathidae
Fish described in 1858